Lee Sang-ho (born November 23, 2000), better known as Effort, is a South Korean professional League of Legends player for Fredit Brion. He made his debut on KeSPA Cup 2017. He was an online trainee of SK Telecom T1 for 7 months before officially joining the team. Effort is well known for his exceptional play on Pyke.

Early life 
He stated in an interview that he used to watch a lot of StarCraft games. His in-game name, Effort, was named after a StarCraft player, Kim "EffOrt" Jung Woo, his favourite player.

He started playing League of Legends during his first year of his secondary school. His role model is Lee "Wolf" Jae-wan, former support player for SK Telecom T1.

Career

Season 7 
SK Telecom T1 announced that they had signed Effort, who was previously a trainee of the team. Effort made his debut on KeSPA Cup 2017 on November 29, 2017. His first match was with Griffin, and his first champion used in his professional career was Blitzcrank. He won his first game against Griffin.

Season 8 
Effort became the starting supporter for SK Telecom T1 in the LCK Spring 2018. He played his first LCK game against ROX Tigers, which he won with a match score of 2–1. In the same season, he played his first playoffs in his career. SK Telecom T1 ended up at 4th place in the Spring season. SKT received 7th place in the Summer season, and 4th place in the Korea Regional Finals, which made them failed to qualify for 2018 League of Legends World Championship.

Season 9 
Effort played his first game of the season in the LCK Summer 2019. His first win of the season was against kt Rolster, where he started as the support player for the second match, breaking the five-game losing streak of SKT in Summer 2019. He became the starting player of the team since then.

He played his second playoffs in his career in Summer 2019. He had his first appearance on stage in the LCK finals on August 31, 2019. He won his first LCK title against Griffin on the same day with a match score of 3–1. His team had qualified as the first seed for LCK in the 2019 League of Legends World Championship, and he was selected as one of the members to represent SK Telecom T1 in World Championship.

Season 10 
On April 25, 2020, Effort and his team won the LCK Spring split finals against Gen.G with a match score of 3–0. This was his second LCK title.

On December 1, 2020, T1 announced the departure of their four-year Support player, Effort. Liiv Sandbox then announced that Effort will be joining them as their new Support player.

Accomplishments

Notes

References

External links 
 

Living people
South Korean esports players
2000 births
T1 (esports) players
League of Legends support players